Carolina Tronconi (22 May 1913 – 11 February 2008) was an Italian gymnast who competed in the 1928 Summer Olympics. In 1928 she won the silver medal as member of the Italian gymnastics team.

External links
 Carolina Tronconi's profile at databaseOlympics.com
 Carolina Tronconi's profile at Sports Reference.com

1913 births
2008 deaths
Italian female artistic gymnasts
Olympic gymnasts of Italy
Gymnasts at the 1928 Summer Olympics
Olympic silver medalists for Italy
Olympic medalists in gymnastics
Medalists at the 1928 Summer Olympics